Deborah Jo Bennett (born 1950) is an American mathematician, mathematics educator, and book author. She is a professor of mathematics at New Jersey City University.

Education and career
Bennett is originally from Tuscaloosa, Alabama; her father was a military officer and her mother worked as a computer systems analyst. She majored in mathematics at the University of Alabama, graduating in 1972, and worked as a researcher at the Institute for Defense Analysis and as an operations researcher for the US Government Accountability Office before returning to graduate school for a master's degree in operations research at George Washington University in 1980.

After a year in Ghana teaching mathematics through the Peace Corps, she became a mathematics instructor at Pace University from 1981 to 1987, and at Farmingdale State College from 1984 to 1993. While doing this, she also completed a Ph.D. in mathematics education at New York University in 1993. Her dissertation, The Development of the Mathematical Concept of Randomness: Educational Implications, was supervised by Kenneth P. Goldberg.

She joined New Jersey City University as an assistant professor of mathematics in 1993, adding a concurrent appointment in education in 1999. She has since become a full professor, and served two terms as president of the University Senate.

Books
Bennett is the coauthor of the textbook Algebra for All (with Phillip Aikey and Julio Guillen, McGraw-Hill, 1997). She is also the author of two popular mathematics books, Randomness (Harvard University Press, 1998), and Logic Made Easy: How to Know When Language Deceives You (W. W. Norton, 2004). Her book Logic Made Easy was listed as an Outstanding Academic Title in 2004 by Choice Reviews.

References

1950 births
People from Tuscaloosa, Alabama
Living people
20th-century American mathematicians
21st-century American mathematicians
American women mathematicians
University of Alabama alumni
George Washington University alumni
New York University alumni
Pace University faculty
Farmingdale State College faculty
New Jersey City University faculty
21st-century American women